Mount Maria is a mountain in the Falkland Islands.

Mount Maria may also refer to:

 Mount Maria, Malaysia, a volcanic cone mountain
 Mount Maria, Queensland, Australia, a rural locality
 The highest point on Maria Island, off the coast of Tasmania, Australia

See also
 Mount Moriah (disambiguation)